Escaped Chasm is a 2019 adventure game developed by Undertale artist Temmie Chang. It was released on her birthday on the independent video game site, Itch.io, as freeware and marks her debut as a video game developer. The game is loosely based on Chang's short film, Dwellers of the Mountain's Forest, and is the first installment of her series, The Dwellers Universe.

The game received praise from players for her video game debut and Fox's musical score. It has a 4.7 star rating with a nearly thousand reviews, making it the second highest rated RPG Maker game on itch.io behind Lonely Wolf Treat. An indirect sequel, Dweller's Empty Path (also known as Escaped Chasm 2), with Game Boy-style graphics, was released on July 10, 2020.

Plot 
The story follows an unnamed lonely girl, who creates drawings of monsters and lives alone in her house with her dying pet snake, Melody. Without her parents, she decides to explore every rooms inside the house and starts writing a diary. On the second day, she meets a strange man with a demonic appearance named Zera, who warns her that the house is slowly descending into chaos. Escaped Chasm has four different endings, which players can get depending on what choices they make in-game:

 On the third day, the unnamed girl tries to leave the house, only to be warned by Zera. The option to leave again is left available, however, and choosing to leave results in the bad ending, which shows the girl slowly shattering and falling still, before returning the player to the title screen.
 On the fourth and last day, three endings occur:
If the player enters every room in the house, and does not pick up the "Familiar Doll" item before entering the parents' room, the room will instead appear as a black void inhabited by a being called Sei, who turns around and jumpscares the player, before the game returns to the title screen.
If she takes the doll before she reaches her parent's room, and then goes to her room after Zera appears, he tells her to make a decision to go to another world, or refuse.
If she decides to go, Zera accepts and opens the portal to the other world. She then walks through the portal and changes into a form reminiscent of the monsters depicted in her drawings.
If she refuses, Zera leaves, and the girl is left alone to die in her house, apologizing to her parents for not being as strong as they thought she was.

Developments 
Chang developed the character sprites and tile design for the game in only five months, alongside her friend Toby Fox and James Roach,  whom she has worked together with on previous works, like Homestuck and Hiveswap. She also worked alongside RPG Maker programmer Archeia, who she worked together with for two games as a bitmap font programmer using the RPG Maker game engine.

References

External links 

 on Itch.io

2019 video games
Fantasy video games
Freeware games
Indie video games
MacOS games
RPG Maker games
Video games about mental health
Video games developed in the United States
Video games featuring female protagonists
Video games scored by Toby Fox
Video games with alternate endings
Windows games